Presente may refer to:
 The Present
 ¡Presente!, the newsletter of the School of the Americas Watch
 Presente.org, an American advocacy group that "exists to amplify the political voice of Latino communities" in the United States
 Presente (album), by Brazilian singer Renato Russo
 Presente (Bajofondo album), 2013